The SEAT Córdoba WRC is a World Rally Car built for the SEAT Sport by SEAT in the World Rally Championship. It is based upon the SEAT Córdoba road car, and was debuted at the 1998 Rally Finland.



Competition history

It featured a 2.0 litre turbocharged engine. The Córdoba WRC competed in the top category of the championship, as SEAT had homologated a World Rally Car version of the Córdoba 16v for competition in the FIA World Rally Championship and other international rallies.

1994 World Drivers' Champion Didier Auriol, of France, and Toni Gardemeister and Harri Rovanperä, both of Finland, were among those to drive the factory cars.

It made its debut at the 1998 Rally Finland, with Harri Rovanperä as the main driver. The car achieved podiums at the 1999 Rally New Zealand, driven by Toni Gardemeister, the 1999 Rally GB, driven by Rovanperä, as well as in the 2000 Safari Rally, driven by Didier Auriol. The works programme concluded at the end of the season of 2000, with the third evolution of the rally car.

However, the Córdoba WRC continued to compete with successful results in national championships in different countries. In Spain, the Córdoba won the national title of all the rallies on gravel with Pedro Diego and Marc Blázquez, and wins in tarmac rallies with Salvador Cañellas Jr.

References

External links

 

All-wheel-drive vehicles
Córdoba WRC
World Rally Cars